The 1988–89 Georgia Tech Yellow Jackets men's basketball team represented Georgia Institute of Technology during the 1988–89 NCAA Division I men's basketball season.

Roster

Rankings

References

Georgia Tech Yellow Jackets men's basketball seasons
Georgia Tech
Georgia Tech